The National Board of Review Award for Best Actor is one of the annual film awards given (since 1945) by the National Board of Review of Motion Pictures.

Winners

1940s

1950s

1960s

1970s

1980s

1990s

2000s

2010s

2020s

Multiple awards

3 wins
 George Clooney (2007, 2009, 2011)
 Gene Hackman (1971, 1974, 1988)

2 wins	
 Robert De Niro (1980, 1990)
 Morgan Freeman (1989, 2009)
 Alec Guinness (1950, 1957)
 Tom Hanks (1994, 2017)
 Jack Nicholson (1975, 1997)
 Laurence Olivier (1946, 1978)
 Peter O'Toole (1969, 1972)
 Ralph Richardson (1949, 1952)

See also
 New York Film Critics Circle Award for Best Actor
 National Society of Film Critics Award for Best Actor
 Los Angeles Film Critics Association Award for Best Actor

References

National Board of Review Awards
Film awards for lead actor
Awards established in 1945
1945 establishments in the United States